Laguna Joyuda, or Albufera de Joyuda, is a natural reservoir located in the municipality of Cabo Rojo in Puerto Rico.

The lagoon is one of only two natural reservoirs in the island of Puerto Rico (the other being Tortuguero Lagoon), and is home to an ample variety of species.

The lagoon is connected to the ocean through a small channel on the south of it, and is frequently used for fishing.

References

External links
Laguna Tortuguero in Ceducapr.com
Laguna Tortuguero in PR-Frogui.com

Lakes of Puerto Rico
Cabo Rojo, Puerto Rico